Royal Bank Tower (Vancouver) is a 16 storey office tower located in downtown Vancouver and served as the regional office for the Royal Bank of Canada until 1973.

Designed by the bank's Chief Architect Sumner Godfrey Davenport, construction began in 1929 and completed in 1931. It was one of two notable projects designed by Davenport.

The mix of Art Deco and Neo-Romanesque office building is now undergoing rezoning application and restoration.

See also

 Royal Centre (1973) - home to Royal Bank and also referred to as Royal Bank Tower

References

Skyscrapers in Vancouver
Bank buildings in Canada
Art Deco architecture in Canada
Romanesque Revival architecture in Canada
Royal Bank of Canada
Office buildings in Canada
Office buildings completed in 1931